is a railway station in the town of Kamiichi, Toyama, Japan, operated by the private railway operator Toyama Chihō Railway.

Lines

Station layout 
The station has one side platform serving a single bi-directional track. The station is unattended.

History
Shin-Ainoki Station was opened on 26 December 2013.

Adjacent stations

See also
 List of railway stations in Japan

References

External links

 

Railway stations in Toyama Prefecture
Railway stations in Japan opened in 2013
Stations of Toyama Chihō Railway
Kamiichi, Toyama